A cartload is usually the contents of a loaded cart.

More particularly, it may also refer to:

 the load, an English unit which appears in Latin documents as the carrus or "cartload"
 the kwian	(), a Thai unit now equal to 2 kiloliters or 2 cubic meters